Richard Kingston (died November 1418) was a Canon of Windsor from 1400 to 1402 and the Dean of Windsor from 1402 to 1418.

Career
He was appointed:
Chancellor of Abergwili 1392
Rector of Pertenhall before 1397
Rector of Yeovil 1397
Rector of Croston, Lancashire 1405
Prebendary of Beverley at the altar of St Mary 1405
Prebendary of Mapesbury in St Paul’s Cathedral 1405 - 1418
Vicar of Stepney 1406 - 1418
Prebendary of Flixton in Lichfield Cathedral 1400 - 1814
Rector of Barrowby, Lincolnshire 1411
Archdeacon of Hereford 1389 - 1404
Archdeacon of Colchester 1405
Prebendary of Cherminster Bere in Salisbury Cathedral 1406 - 1418
Rector of Fakenham, Norfolk
Prebendary of Wells 
Prebendary of Cublington in Hereford Cathedral 1391
Prebendary of Ballingthorpe in Hereford Cathedral 1393
Clerk of Works in Hereford Castle 1401
Treasurer of the Royal Household 1405 - 1407
 
He was appointed to the seventh stall in St George's Chapel, Windsor Castle in 1400, and held the stall until made Dean of Windsor in 1402.

See also 
Catholic Church in England

Notes 

1418 deaths
Deans of the Chapel Royal
Canons of Windsor
Deans of Windsor
Archdeacons of Hereford
Archdeacons of Colchester
Treasurers of the Household
Year of birth missing